Grupo Desportivo 1º de Maio is a football club that plays in the island of Principe in São Tomé and Príncipe.  The team plays in the Principe Island League in its local division and plays at Estádio 13 de Julho in the island capital as every club on the island does.

History
The team was founded on May 1, 1982 and named after the foundation of the date of the club. Its current coach is Aldo Cruz.

The club celebrated its 10th anniversary in 1992 and later celebrated its 25th anniversary in 2007.

Its logo has a gold-yellow pointed crest with a thin dark green edge with the club name and the club's location inside and on top, Djunta Mó, the Príncipe Creole form.  It has a sky blue colored football (soccer ball) in the middle with two people shaking hands inside.  It also has three stars on the bottom, colored green, red and yellow.

In 1999, the club won their first regional cup title and played in the national semis where they were placed at the time, they lost a match at that round and was out of the competition. In 2000, the club won the previous round of the regional cup, the club lost at the semi-final stage. In 2001, the club finished fifth and last place.  The team won a title in 2003 beating Inter Bom-Bom by 4 points. In regional title totals, it became shared with UDAPB in 2007 and Sporting Príncipe in 2011, up to that time, its title totals were third and last.  After Sporting's win in 2012, their totals became fifth.

Honours
 Taça Regional de Príncipe: 1
1999

 Principe Island Championship: 2
2003

Statistics
Best position: Finalist (national)
Appearances:
National Championships 1
Regional Championships: 19

References

External links
1º de Maio at Facebook 
Club profile at the Final Ball

Football clubs in São Tomé and Príncipe
Príncipe Island League
1982 establishments in São Tomé and Príncipe